David Darling (born 29 July 1953 in Glossop, Derbyshire) is an English astronomer, freelance science writer, and musician. Darling has published numerous popular science works, including Life Everywhere: The Maverick Science of Astrobiology in 2001 and The Universal Book of Mathematics in 2004. He maintains the online Internet Encyclopedia of Science.

A review of Darling's book Soul Search, stated that "he develops a sort of scientific pantheism positing that, with death, we move from the narrow consciousness of our highly selective, reality-filtering brain to the wider, timeless consciousness of the unbound universe."

Bibliography
 We Are Not Alone: Why We Have Already Found Extraterrestrial Life (2010).  (paperback)
 Gravity's Arc: The Story of Gravity from Aristotle to Einstein and Beyond (2006).  (hardcover)
 Teleportation: The Impossible Leap (2005).  (hardcover)
 The Universal Book of Mathematics: From Abracadabra to Zeno's Paradoxes (2004).  (hardcover)
 The Universal Book of Astronomy: From the Andromeda Galaxy to the Zone of Avoidance (2003).  (hardcover)
 The Complete Book of Spaceflight: From Apollo 1 to Zero Gravity (2002).  (hardcover)
 Life Everywhere: The Maverick Science of Astrobiology (2001).  (hardcover)
 The Extraterrestrial Encyclopedia: An Alphabetical Reference to All Life in the Universe (2000)  (paperback)
 Zen Physics: The Science of Death, the Logic of Reincarnation (1996).  (hardcover)
 Soul Search : A Scientist Explores the Afterlife (1995).  (hardcover)
 Equations of Eternity: Speculations on Consciousness, Meaning, and the Mathematical Rules That Orchestrate the Cosmos (1993).  (hardcover)
 Deep Time: The Journey of a Single Subatomic Particle From the Moment of Creation To the Death of the Universe and Beyond (1989).  (hardcover)

Juvenile books
 Beyond 2000 series (1995–96)
 Micromachines and Nanotechnology: The Amazing New World of the Ultrasmall 
 Genetic Engineering: Redrawing the Blueprint of Life 
 The Health Revolution: Surgery and Medicine in the Twenty-first Century 
 Computers of the Future: Intelligent Machines and Virtual Reality 
 Experiment! series (1991–92)
 Spiderwebs to Skyscrapers: The Science of Structure 
 From Glasses to Gases: The Science of Matter 
 Between Fire and Ice: The Science of Heat 
 Sounds Interesting: The Science of Acoustics 
 Up, Up and Away: The Science of Flight 
 Making Light Work: The Science of Optics 
 Could You Ever? series (1990–91)
 Could You Ever Live Forever? 
 Could You Ever Build a Time Machine? 
 Could You Ever Travel To the Stars? 
 Could You Ever Meet an Alien? 
 Could You Ever Speak Chimpanzee? 
 Could You Ever Dig a Hole To China? 
 The World of Computers series (1986)
 Inside Computers: Hardware and Software 
 The Microchip Revolution 
 Computers At Home: Today and Tomorrow 
 Robots and the Intelligent Computer 
 Fast, Faster, Fastest: The Story of Supercomputers 
 Discovering Our Universe series (1984–85)
 The Sun: Our Neighborhood Star 
 The Moon: A Spaceflight Away 
 Comets, Meteors, and Asteroids: Rocks in Space 
 The Planets: The Next Frontier 
 Where Are We Going in Space 
 Stars: From Birth to Black Hole 
 Galaxies: Cities of Stars 
 The Universe: Past, Present, and Future 
 The New Astronomy: An Ever-Changing Universe 
 Other Worlds: Is There Life Out There?

References

External links
 cosmosportal.org, biography
 The Worlds of David Darling, official site

1953 births
Living people
People from Glossop
20th-century British astronomers
English science writers
Pantheists
Writers about religion and science